Cardiastethus elegans is a species of bugs in the family Anthocoridae. It has a Neotropical distribution.

References

External links 

 Cardiastethus elegans at insectoid.info

Anthocoridae
Insects described in 1894